Mario Kvesić (born 12 January 1992) is a Bosnian professional footballer who plays for Olimpija Ljubljana as a midfielder.

Career statistics

References

External links
	

1992 births
Living people
People from Široki Brijeg
Croats of Bosnia and Herzegovina
Association football midfielders
Bosnia and Herzegovina footballers
Bosnia and Herzegovina youth international footballers
Bosnia and Herzegovina under-21 international footballers
Croatian footballers
NK Široki Brijeg players
RNK Split players
FC Erzgebirge Aue players
1. FC Magdeburg players
NK Olimpija Ljubljana (2005) players
Pohang Steelers players
Premier League of Bosnia and Herzegovina players
Croatian Football League players
3. Liga players
2. Bundesliga players
Slovenian PrvaLiga players
K League 1 players
Croatian expatriate footballers
Bosnia and Herzegovina expatriate footballers
Expatriate footballers in Germany
Bosnia and Herzegovina expatriate sportspeople in Germany
Expatriate footballers in Slovenia
Bosnia and Herzegovina expatriate sportspeople in Slovenia
Expatriate footballers in South Korea
Croatian expatriate sportspeople in South Korea
Bosnia and Herzegovina expatriate sportspeople in South Korea